Magic is a 1978 American psychological horror drama film starring Anthony Hopkins, Ann-Margret and Burgess Meredith. The film, which was directed by Richard Attenborough, is based on a screenplay by William Goldman, who wrote the novel upon which it was based. The score was composed by Jerry Goldsmith.

Plot 
After Charles "Corky" Withers (Hopkins) fails in his first attempt at professional magic, his mentor Merlin (E. J. André) says that he needs to have a better gimmick. A year later, Corky comes back as a combination magician and ventriloquist with a foul-mouthed dummy named Fats, becoming a huge success. Corky's powerful agent, Ben Greene (Meredith), is on the verge of signing him for his own television show, but Corky bails out for the Catskills, where he grew up.  His talent agent thinks that Corky is "afraid of success". In truth, however, Corky does not want to take the TV network's required medical examination because the doctors might find out that he suffers from severe mental issues, and that even off-stage he cannot control Fats (a manifestation of Corky's id).

In the Catskills, Corky reunites with his high school crush, Peggy Ann Snow (Ann-Margret), who is stuck in a passionless marriage with Duke (Ed Lauter), Corky's friend from high school. A magic trick with a deck of cards charms Peggy into thinking they are soulmates, leading to them having sex. This sparks the jealousy not only of Duke, but also Fats. In the midst of an argument "between" Corky and Fats, Greene arrives unexpectedly and confronts Corky, discovering the truth about Corky's state of mind. Corky pleads that nothing is wrong with him and that he is just rehearsing, so Greene puts him to the test, saying "Make Fats shut up for 5 minutes." Corky puts aside Fats, but is unable to last 5 minutes without delivering a rapid stream of speech through Fats. Greene demands that Corky get help and leaves to make some calls to the doctors, but Fats convinces Corky to kill him. Corky chases after Greene in the woods and bludgeons him with Fats' hard, wooden head and then attempts to drag the body into a lake. However, a still-living Greene suddenly lunges at him, causing Corky to drown him.

The next morning, Fats becomes even more possessive and jealous when Corky says that he plans to elope with Peggy and leave the dummy behind. Duke returns from his trip earlier than expected. Suspecting his wife has cheated on him, he wants to have a talk with Corky by the lake. Rather than confront him, Duke awkwardly confides to Corky that he loves Peggy and is worried about losing her. Duke suddenly spots Greene's body on the edge of the lake. Duke, believing Greene could still be alive, sends Corky to get help. Curious, he decides to search Corky's cabin, where Fats stabs him to death with a knife with "help" from Corky.

An increasingly deranged Corky manages to pull himself together and persuade Peggy to run away with him, but she insists on waiting to tell Duke face to face. She thinks everything is fine until Fats "comes alive" and reveals that Corky's card trick is only a ruse he uses to seduce women and that Peggy is only the latest of his conquests. Repulsed, she rejects Corky and locks herself in her bedroom. Fats says that, from this point on, he will make the decisions in Corky's life, immediately asserting this new authority by ordering Corky to kill Peggy.

Corky, turning on the charm and using Fats' voice, apologizes to Peggy through her locked door and leaves her a wooden heart that he carved. A short while later, Corky returns with a bloodstained knife. Fats seems pleased — until it is revealed that the blood on the knife is Corky's, who has fatally stabbed himself so that he will not kill anyone else. As a result, Fats also feels faint. They wonder which one of them will die first. Moments later, Peggy returns to the cabin, happily calling out that she has changed her mind and has decided to run away with Corky after all. As she speaks, she playfully changes her voice to impersonate Fats.

Cast 
 Anthony Hopkins as Corky Withers (and the voice of Fats)
 Ann-Margret as Peggy Ann Snow
 Burgess Meredith as Ben Greene
 Ed Lauter as Duke
 E. J. André as Merlin
 Jerry Houser as Taxi Driver
 David Ogden Stiers as Todson
 Lillian Randolph as Sadie

Production 
In March 1976, Joseph E. Levine had purchased the film rights to Goldman's novel for $1 million, with Goldman hired to write the screenplay. By June 1976, Norman Jewison had been hired to direct the film. Jewison wanted Jack Nicholson to star, but Nicholson turned it down, claiming he did not want to wear a hairpiece. Steven Spielberg expressed interest in directing the film and considered casting Robert De Niro for Corky. Richard Attenborough, who had directed A Bridge Too Far with Goldman and Levine, then agreed to direct.

Laurence Olivier was offered the role of the agent but was unable to do it, and then Burgess Meredith was cast. Meredith landed the role after walking into the 21 Club one night when Levine was there – Levine cast him on the spot. Meredith modelled his performance on the agent Swifty Lazar, even shaving his head to look like Lazar. "I tried to get his cool, understated manner, his sharp clothes, and most of all, his way of speaking softly so that you've got to lean over to hear what he's saying", said Meredith. Goldman later wrote about the film that "Burgess Meredith was perfect and Tony Hopkins...was so wonderful here. But running stride for stride with him was Miss Olsson. I think Ann-Margret is the least appreciated emotional actress anywhere." 

Ann-Margret and Anthony Hopkins were each paid around $300,000 for their performances.

Filming 
Exteriors were shot in Ukiah, California.
Most of the exterior shots were shot at Le Trianon resort on the Blue Lake in Upper Lake, California.

Music 
The score was composed and conducted by Jerry Goldsmith.  The complete soundtrack was released on CD through Varèse Sarabande in April 2003 and features 22 tracks score at a running time of 42 minutes. It was subsequently reissued by La-La Land Records.

Home media
Because Disney via 20th Century Studios never owned complete rights to this film, other companies (especially Embassy and, currently MGM) have been able to release home video versions of Magic under different licenses. However, legal complications kept the film from being formally reissued on VHS and DVD in the last decade due in part to Embassy Pictures' corporate holdings being split among different entities. Recently, the rights were acquired by the American Movie Classics division of AMC Film Holdings, LLC, and the TV rights are handled for syndication by Trifecta Entertainment & Media (under Paramount Television Studios). An unedited version is available on widescreen DVD and Blu-ray.

Reception 
Gene Siskel of the Chicago Tribune gave the film a complete four-star review, explaining it was because "[the film] scared me, because I admired Hopkins' performance as much as any in this year, and because it would have been so easy for a film such as this to fail." He later ranked it at number 9 on his list of the 10 best films of 1978. On the syndicated film review program Sneak Previews, Roger Ebert admired Hopkins' and Burgess Meredith's performances, and Attenborough's direction but expressed disappointment at the final act, stating "I don't think the screenplay does justice to the talent of the people who get into the picture." 

Vincent Canby of The New York Times wrote that "Magic is neither eerie nor effective. It is, however, very heavy of hand." He praised Hopkins' performance, but criticized the screenplay for spending "too much time on irrelevant details, including flashbacks and jumps forward that neither inform nor amuse but simply look trendy in the dated fashion of that word." Similarly, Dale Pollock of Variety wrote: "The dilemma of 'Magic' is that the results never live up to the standards established in the film's opening half-hour. Through flashbacks and claustrophobic editing by John Booth, the relationship between Hopkins and his eerily-realistic dummy, Fats, is well-documented. So is the introduction of Burgess Meredith, well cast as a Swifty Lazar-type of superagent ...It's this stereotyped plotting and conclusion that robs 'Magic' of its initial, special quality". Judith Martin, reviewing for The Washington Post, ended her review, writing "the thrills of a conventional horror story have been blown up so pretentiously that they're no more scary than balloon monsters."

However, The Science Fiction, Horror and Fantasy Film Review 1990 writeup of the film remarks that Hopkins appears stiff in the lead role, but praised the supporting cast: "Ann-Margret...invests her role with a considerable sparkle. Particularly good is the great and underrated Burgess Meredith whose sharp and alert Hollywood agent is a real plum of a performance. Jerry Goldsmith also adds a fine nervy carnivalesque score." On Metacritic, the film has a weighted average score of 49 out of 100 based on 10 critics, indicating "mixed or average reviews".

Awards and nominations 
Goldman received a 1979 Edgar Award, from the Mystery Writers of America, for Best Motion Picture Screenplay. Hopkins received both Golden Globe and BAFTA nominations for his role as the tragically disturbed Corky. Meredith received the Saturn Award for Best Supporting Actor.

See also 
Madness resulting from one person living two personas through a ventriloquist's dummy has been portrayed several times before in film and television, most notably: 
 The Great Gabbo, a 1929 film 
 Dead of Night, a 1945 British film
 Knock on Wood, a 1954 film
 "The Dummy", a 1962 episode of The Twilight Zone
 "Caesar and Me", a 1964 episode of The Twilight Zone
 Devil Doll, a 1964 film
 Generation 13 is a 1995 concept album by Saga partly influenced by Magic.
 "Conky", a 2004 episode of Trailer Park Boys
 "Read My Lips", a 1993 episode of Batman: The Animated Series, features a villain called the Ventriloquist, who leads a group of criminals through the persona of his dummy Scarface.
 "The Puppet Show", a 1997 episode of Buffy the Vampire Slayer.

References

Bibliography

External links 
 
 
 
 

1978 films
1978 horror films
1970s psychological drama films

Adultery in films
American psychological drama films
American psychological horror films
Catskills
Films about dissociative identity disorder
Films about magic and magicians
Films about murderers
Films based on American horror novels
Films based on works by William Goldman
Films directed by Richard Attenborough
1970s horror drama films
20th Century Fox films
Films with screenplays by William Goldman
Films scored by Jerry Goldsmith
Puppet films
Films set in New York (state)
Films shot in California
Edgar Award-winning works
Ventriloquism
American horror drama films
1978 drama films
1970s English-language films
1970s American films